Kallamkunnu is the second-largest city (Small City) in Nadavaramba and 15th-largest in Irinjalakuda. With an estimated population of 3000 in 2007, it is the principal Ward of the Velukkara Panchayath Area, a region about 500 residents projected to reach 700 between 2010 and 2012.

Cities and towns in Thrissur district